The 2017 Big West Conference women's soccer tournament was the postseason women's soccer tournament for the Big West Conference held on November 2 and 5, 2017. The three-match tournament took place at Matador Soccer Field in Northridge, California. The four-team single-elimination tournament consisted of two rounds based on seeding from regular season conference play. The defending champions were the Long Beach State 49ers, but they failed to qualify for the 2017 tournament. The Cal State Fullerton Titans won the title by virtue of winning the penalty shoot-out tiebreaking procedure following a tie with the Cal State Northridge Matadors in the final. This was the seventh Big West tournament title for the Cal State Fullerton program and the fifth for head coach Demian Brown.

Bracket

Schedule

Semifinals

Final

Statistics

Goalscorers 

2 Goals

 Cynthia Sanchez - Cal State Northridge

1 Goal

 Sydney Carr - UC Irvine
 Marissa Favela - Cal State Northridge
 Lindsay Kutscher - Cal State Northridge
 Kaycee Hoover - Cal State Fullerton
 Maribell Morales - Cal State Fullerton
 Nano Oronoz - Cal State Fullerton

See also 
 Big West Conference
 2017 NCAA Division I women's soccer season
 2017 NCAA Division I Women's Soccer Tournament
 2017 Big West Conference Men's Soccer Tournament

References

External links 
2017 Big West Women's Soccer Tournament

Big West Conference Women's Soccer Tournament
2017 Big West Conference women's soccer season